Hilton Philipson (5 November 1892 – 12 April 1941), also known as Hylton Phillipson was a politician in the United Kingdom.

Biography
Standing as a National Liberal Party candidate, he was elected at the 1922 general election as Member of Parliament (MP) for Berwick-upon-Tweed, but the election was overturned on petition. At the resulting by-election, his wife Mabel stood as the Conservative candidate, and won the election.  She held the seat until 1929.

At the 1923 general election, Hilton Philipson stood as a Conservative in the nearby Wansbeck constituency, but failed to unseat the sitting Labour MP. In 1924 he was defeated again in Gateshead, and did not stand for Parliament again.

He was married to Mabel Philipson. They resided at 77 Lancaster Gate in London and at 1 Adelaide Mansions in Hove, East Sussex.

See also
List of United Kingdom MPs with the shortest service

References

External links 

1892 births
1941 deaths
Politicians from London
People from Hove
National Liberal Party (UK, 1922) politicians
Conservative Party (UK) parliamentary candidates
Members of the Parliament of the United Kingdom for English constituencies
UK MPs 1922–1923
Scots Guards officers